Playford may refer to:

Places

 City of Playford, Australia
 Electoral district of Playford, Australia
 Playford B Power Station, South Australia
 Playford, Suffolk, a village in England
 Hotel in Australia, part of Accor Hotels

People

The Playford family of British rowers including
Francis Playford (1825-1896)
Herbert Playford (1831-1883)
Frank Lumley Playford (1855-1931)
Humphrey Playford (b 1896)
The Playford family of Australians, including:
Rev. Thomas Playford , aka Thomas Playford I (1795–1873), preacher in South Australia
Thomas Playford II, Premier of South Australia
Thomas Playford IV, Premier of South Australia
John Playford, British music publisher, editor of The English Dancing Master
Henry Playford, John's son, also a music publisher